Thomas Geoffrey Evans, (born 1 May 1942) is a former Wales international rugby union player, who was born in Llanelli. In 1971 he toured New Zealand with the British and Irish Lions as a replacement.  He won seven Wales caps as a lock forward at the start of the 1970s and also played club rugby for London Welsh RFC.

Evans became manager of the Wales RFU team in 1995, following the resignation of the previous management after Wales lost all four matches in the Five Nations championship. He was appointed a Welsh selector in 1993.

References

External links
 Statistical biography of Geoff Evans scrum.com

1942 births
Living people
Welsh rugby union players
Wales international rugby union players
British & Irish Lions rugby union players from Wales
London Welsh RFC players
Rugby union players from Llanelli
Surrey RFU players
Rugby union locks